North Shore Central School District is a public school district in Nassau County, New York.  It serves several villages and hamlets in the North Shore region of Long Island, specifically Glenwood Landing, Glen Head, Sea Cliff, Old Brookville, and parts of Greenvale and Roslyn Harbor. About 2,567 students attend North Shore schools.  It has a single high school, North Shore High School.

Notable alumni include Michael McKean, Saturday Night Live actress Kate McKinnon, and best-selling novelist Darin Strauss.

History

Formation 

North Shore Central School District was formed in 1953 from the smaller Sea Cliff, Glen Head, and Glenwood Landing districts.  The merger was generally opposed by Glenwood Landing residents, who did not want to share the tax revenues from the Glenwood Generating Station, while the other districts were desirous of them.  Glenwood Landing Board of Education President William Anderson once explained the situation as "we endure the smoke, let's have the gravy."  An earlier vote that year on consolidating the districts failed because that process required the vote to succeed in all three districts individually, while the centralization process only required a simple majority across all voters.  It was the first central school district in Nassau County, and was accordingly referred to as "Central School District No. 1" under the numbering scheme of the time.

At the time of centralization Glenwood Landing School was considered preferable because of its facilities and staff.  Sea Cliff School, which had been built in 1912 and expanded in 1926, was a K–12 school prior to centralization.  Glen Head School had been built in 1924.  Glenwood Landing School's "Old Building" had been built in 1927 and its "New Building" in 1949.  The Glenwood Landing and Glen Head Schools did not provide high school education, and their students attended high school in Sea Cliff, Glen Cove, or Roslyn.

The first new building opened by the district was the six-classroom Kissam Lane School in 1956, which would later become North Shore Middle School.  Initially a K–3 school, it was designed by Vincent Kling and won national architectural awards for its openness and simple, compact design, with floor-to-ceiling windows and an exterior doorway in every classroom.  In 1960, the construction of the junior high school on the site was approved, with the Kissam Lane School incorporated into the new building.  It opened in 1961.

The construction of North Shore High School was delayed by a lawsuit by residents who wanted to undo the district centralization, but it opened in 1957.   An addition was made to Glenwood Landing School in 1965.

Later history 
In the 1970s, Sea Cliff School was considered to be in such a state of disrepair that there were several proposals to demolish and replace it, but these were consistently defeated by voters.  As of 1977, the district had the lowest property tax rate in Nassau County due to the presence of the Glenwood Generating Station.

Additions were made to Glen Head School in 1994, to North Shore Middle School in 1990 and 1994, and to North Shore High School in the 1990s.

A series of major renovations and additions to all five school buildings was performed in 2000.  The most major work included demolishing and replacing the north and south wings of Sea Cliff School.  The renovations added 15 classrooms and a new cafeteria and library to the school.  During the renovation, Sea Cliff students temporarily used the nearby vacant St. Boniface Parish school building.  Additionally, an addition was constructed to Glenwood Landing School, and North Shore Middle School's cafeteria was expanded.

A more minor round of renovations to district buildings occurred in 2014.

The Glenwood Generating Plant was decommissioned and demolished during 2012–2015.  Its demolition raised concern about the financial effects on North Shore School District, as the over $20 million annual tax payments from the plant provided 20 percent of the district's budget.  This led to fears of a 15–19% increase in residential taxes in late 2014. However, it was determined that according to state law there could be no more than a 1% increase in property taxes for a given tax class as a result of a decreased tax assessment in another class (the four tax classes being residential, cooperatives/condominiums, commercial, and utilities). The financial effects on the district would thus have to be mitigated by increased taxes on remaining utilities in the district, as well as a $2.5 million one-time grant from the state arranged by local state legislators.  The site's municipal and school payments in lieu of taxes fell from $23.2 million in 2012 to $16.6 million in 2015.

Schools 
Secondary schools:
North Shore High School (grades 9-12)
North Shore Middle School (grades 6-8)

Primary schools: (grades K-5)
Glenwood Landing Elementary School
Sea Cliff Elementary School
Glen Head Elementary School

See also 

List of school districts in New York

References

External links 

School districts in New York (state)
Education in Nassau County, New York